Being Eve is a teen comedy-drama television series from New Zealand, originally shown on TV3 from 2001 to 2002, and later broadcast on Noggin's teen block The N in the US. Being Eve focuses on a teenage girl, Eve Baxter, and her daily problems. Her parents are divorced but live next door to each other. Eve was in love with a boy named Adam. They broke up at the beginning of the second season, and she ends up with another boy named Sam Hooper, with whom she had her first kiss when they were kids.

Cast

Main characters
Fleur Saville as Eve Baxter (26 episodes, 2001–2002) 
Stephen Lovatt as Tim Baxter (26 episodes, 2001–2002) 
Joanna Morrison as Sylvie Stern (26 episodes, 2001–2002) 
Alison Bruce as Vivienne Baxter (26 episodes, 2001–2002) 
Tandi Wright as Alannah Lush (26 episodes, 2001–2002) 
Lionel Wickliffe as Matt Te Ahi (26 episodes, 2001–2002) 
Leighton Cardno as Ned Baxter (26 episodes, 2001–2002) 
Cameron Stanton as Caleb Baxter (26 episodes, 2001–2002) 
Michelle O'Brien as Charlotte Tucker (26 episodes, 2001–2002) 
Vicki Lin as Melanie (20 episodes, 2001–2002) 
Renee Leonard-Rogers as Melissa (20 episodes, 2001–2002) 
Paul Barrett as Mr. Inglewood (20 episodes, 2001–2002) 
Karl Willetts as Lenny (17 episodes, 2001–2002) 
James Hobby as Floyd (17 episodes, 2001–2002) 
David de Lautour as Adam Le Beau (15 episodes, 2001–2002) 
Jay Ryan as Sam Hooper (13 episodes, 2002) 
David Taylor as Corban (13 episodes, 2002)

Recurring characters
Todd Emerson as Harley (8 episodes, 2002) 
James Napier as Jared Preston (7 episodes, 2001–2002) 
Hannah Banks as Imogen (6 episodes, 2002) 
Lee Wenham as Gus (6 episodes, 2001) 
Sherril Cooper as Ms. Grieveley (5 episodes, 2001–2002) 
Ben Crowder as Librarian (5 episodes, 2001–2002) 
Rosalie Carey as Mrs. Sparrow (5 episodes, 2001) 
Brett O'Gorman as Oliver Tucker (4 episodes, 2001–2002) 
Wendy Meyer as Mrs. Whittering (4 episodes, 2001) 
Martin Baynton as Leo (3 episodes, 2001–2002) 
Nicole Whippy as Elektra (3 episodes, 2002) 
Margaret-Mary Hollins as Sukhita (3 episodes, 2001–2002) 
Jacob Teleiai as Jason (3 episodes, 2001–2002) 
Tania Anderson as Sal (2 episodes, 2001) 
Michelle Langstone as Miss Renee (2 episodes, 2001) 
Jimmy Berkeley as 8 Year Old Ned (2 episodes, 2002) 
James Stanton as Jack Sherwin (2 episodes, 2002) 
Sam Wallace as Daniel (2 episodes, 2002) 
Jodi Russell as Cheerleader Barbie (2 episodes, 2002) 
Vanessa Saunders as Cheerleader Barbie (2 episodes, 2002) 
Mandy McMullin as Josie Le Beau (2 episodes, 2001) 
Richard Lambeth as Scott (2 episodes, 2001)

Episodes

Season 1 (2001)

Season 2 (2002)

DVD releases
Both seasons were combined on the same DVD release.

External links 
 

2000s New Zealand television series
2001 New Zealand television series debuts
2002 New Zealand television series endings
English-language television shows
New Zealand children's television series
New Zealand comedy-drama television series
Television series about teenagers
Television series by South Pacific Pictures
Television shows filmed in New Zealand
Television shows funded by NZ on Air
Television shows set in Auckland
Three (TV channel) original programming